Israel women's national goalball team is the women's national team of Israel.  Goalball is a team sport designed specifically for athletes with a vision impairment.  It takes part in international competitions.

Paralympic Games

2016 Rio de Janeiro 

The team competed in the 2016 Summer Paralympics, with competition from Thursday 8 September to finals on Friday 16 September 2016, in the temporary Future Arena, Rio de Janeiro, Brazil.

The Algerian women's team did not show up in time for its matches against the United States or Israel. The team missed connecting flights in Rome after setting out from a training camp in Poland. There were suspicions of a boycott. The International Paralympic Committee's spokesman, Craig Spence, said: "They are still sticking to their story that they suffered the worst transport issues known to man. Whether we believe it is a question mark and we are looking into it." Their first two games were recorded as 10–0 walkover wins for the other team. The team of Algeria arrived in Rio on 11 September. Spence remarked: "Fingers crossed they can manage to travel from the (Athletes') Village to the goalball venue in less than six days."

Quarter-finals

2020 Tokyo 

The team was selected for Tokyo 2020 following the 2019 European Championships in Rostock, Germany.  First place Turkey had already qualified through second place in the 2018 World Championships.

Team captain Ilham Mahamid Rozin, who has the eye disease achromatopsia, is married to the Israel men's national goalball team captain, Michael Rozin.

Round-robin

World Championships

2010 Sheffield 

The team competed in the 2010 World Championships, from 20 to 25 June 2010, in Sheffield, England, in Group X.

2014 Espoo  

The team competed in the 2014 World Championships from 30 June to 5 July 2014, in Espoo, Finland.  They placed fourth in Pool Y, and lost to Turkey in the quarter-finals, 10:2.

Athletes: Elham Mahamid (#1), Yarden Adika (#3), Roni Ohayon (#5), Lihi Ben David (#6), Chen Mazliach (#7).

2018 Malmö 

The team competed in the 2018 World Championships from 3 to 8 June 2018, in Malmö, Sweden.  They placed fifth in Pool C, and eleventh in overall final standings.

Athletes included: Elham Mahamid, Lihi Ben David.

2022 Matosinhos 

The team competed in the 2022 World Championships from 7 to 16 December 2022, at the Centro de Desportos e Congressos de Matosinhos, Portugal.  There were sixteen men's and sixteen women's teams.  They placed first in Pool B, and fourth in final standings.

IBSA World Games

2015 Seoul  

The team competed in the 2015 IBSA World Games from 10 to 17 May 2015, in Seoul, South Korea. Taking first, beating China 4:1, this allowed them to qualify for the 2016 Rio de Janeiro Paralympic Games.

Regional championships 

The team competes in IBSA Europe goalball region, although geographically in the IBSA Asia region.

2009 Munich (Group A) 

Munich, Germany hosted the 2009 European Championships with eleven teams taking part.  The team finished the event in sixth place. The team competed at the 2013 European Championships in Turkey, where they finished third.

Athletes: Lihi Yehudith Ben David, Gal Hamrani, Elham Mahamid, Chen Mazliach, and Or Mizrachi.

2013 Konya (Group A)  

The team competed in the 2013 IBSA Goalball European Championships, Group A, from 1 to 11 November 2013, at Konya, Turkey.  They beat Finland in the bronze medal game, 5:3.

2015 Lithuania (Group A) 

The team competed in the 2015 IBSA Goalball European A Championships in Lithuania.  They lost the bronze medal game to Ukraine, 4:5.

2017 Pajulahti (Group A) 

The team competed in the 2017 IBSA Goalball European A Championships from 15 to 23 September 2017, at Pajulahti, Nastola, Finland.  They placed third behind Turkey and winners Russia.

Athletes included: Lihi Ben David, Elham Mahamid.

2019 Rostock (Group A) 

The team competed in the 2019 IBSA Goalball European A Championships from 5 to 14 October 2019, in Rostock, Germany.  They placed second in the final standings.  This earned them a slot at the 2020 Tokyo Paralympic Games as Turkey already had a slot.

Athletes included: Lihi Ben David, Noa Malka, Or Mizrahi, and Roni Ohayon.

Competitive history 
The table below contains individual game results for the team in international matches and competitions.

Goal scoring by competition

See also 

 Disabled sports
 Israel men's national goalball team
 Israel at the Paralympics

References

Goalball women's
National women's goalball teams
Israel at the Paralympics
European national goalball teams